Dar Sad District is a district of the Aden Governorate, Yemen. As of 2003, the district had a population of 79,712 inhabitants.

References

Districts of Aden Governorate
Aden Governorate